The Dingyuan class consisted of a pair of ironclad warships— and —built for the Imperial Chinese Navy in the 1880s. They were the first ships of that size to be built for the Chinese Navy, having been constructed by Stettiner Vulcan AG in Germany. Originally expected to be a class of 12 ships, before being reduced to three and then two, with  having been reduced in size to that of a protected cruiser.

They were prevented from sailing to China during the Sino-French War, but first saw combat at the Battle of the Yalu River on 17 September 1894, during the First Sino-Japanese War. They were next in combat during the Battle of Weihaiwei in early 1895, where they were blockaded in the harbour. Dingyuen was struck by a torpedo, and was beached where it continued to operate as a defensive fort. When the fleet was surrendered to the Japanese, she was destroyed while Zhenyuan became the first battleship of the Imperial Japanese Navy as Chin Yen. She was eventually removed from the Navy list in 1911, and was sold for scrap the following year.

Design
Naval conflicts with Western powers earlier in the 19th century such as the First and Second Opium Wars, during which European warships decisively defeated China's traditional junk fleets, prompted a major rearmament program that began in the 1880s under the Viceroy of Zhili province, Li Hongzhang. Advisers from the British Royal Navy assisted the program, and the first group of ships—several ironclad gunboats and two small cruisers—were bought from British shipyards. Britain was unwilling to sell China warships of this size for fear of offending the Russian Empire, despite having sold Japan similar vessels, so Li turned to German shipyards.

The German Kaiserliche Marine (Imperial Navy) was completing the four s, and offered to sell China ships built to a modified design. Rather than mounting the main guns in a pair of large, open barbettes as in the Sachsen class, the new design placed four guns in two rotating barbettes towards the front of each ship.

General characteristics and machinery
The ships' hulls were constructed out of steel, and were built with a naval ram in the bow. Steering was controlled by a single rudder. Each vessel had a crew of 363 officers and enlisted men. Two heavy military masts were fitted, one just in front of the main battery guns and one behind. A hurricane deck covered the turrets and ran from the foremast to the funnels. Each ship carried a pair of second-class torpedo boats astern of the funnels, along with derricks to unload them.

Dingyuan and Zhenyuan were powered by a pair of horizontal, three-cylinder trunk steam engines, each of which drove a single screw propeller. Steam was provided by eight cylindrical boilers that were ducted into a pair of funnels amidships. The boilers were divided into four boiler rooms. Both ships were fitted with sails for the voyage from Germany to China, though they were later removed.

Armament and armour

The ships were armed with a main battery of four  20-caliber guns, mounted in two barbettes. The barbettes are sometimes reported to have been in different arrangements on Dingyuan and Zhenyuan, but both ships' guns were arranged identically, with the starboard barbette forward of the port one. The guns themselves were  Krupp guns. The placement of the guns caused trim problems that led the ships to be wet forward.

The secondary battery consisted of two  guns mounted individually, one on the bow and the other on the stern. For defence against torpedo boats, they carried a pair of  Hotchkiss revolver cannons and eight  Maxim-Nordenfelt quick-firing guns in casemates.

Three  torpedo tubes rounded out the armament; one was mounted in the stern, and the other two were placed forward of the main battery, all above water. They are sometimes reported to have been  torpedo tubes.

The belt armour of the class was 14 in thick, while the barbettes for the main armament were 12 in. A  armoured deck ran the entire length of the ships, leaving the ends undefended.

Ships

Service history

Completed in early 1883 and 1884, respectively, Dingyuan and Zhenyuan were to be sailed to China by a German crew, but delays—primarily from France following the outbreak of the Sino-French War in 1884—kept the ships in Germany. A German crew took Dingyuan out for a firing test at sea, causing glass to shatter around the ship, along with damage to a funnel. After the war ended in April 1885, the two ironclads were permitted to depart for China, along with Jiyuan. The three ships arrived in China in October and they were formally commissioned into the Beiyang Fleet. Dingyuan was the flagship of the new formation, and by the time of the First Sino-Japanese War, she was under the command of Commodore Liu Pu-chan, while Admiral Ding Ruchang was also stationed on board. Zhenyuan was under the command of Captain Lin T'ai-tseng. With the war breaking out in 1894, both ships of the Dingyuan class first saw combat at the Battle of the Yalu River on 17 September.

The two ships formed the middle of the Chinese line of battle, with orders for them to act in support of each other. Her signalling mast was also disabled, causing the Chinese fleet to operate purely in the preassigned pairs throughout the battle. During the course of the battle, the main part of the Japanese fleet concentrated fire on the two ironclads, but the two vessels remained afloat following the Japanese withdrawal as darkness approached. Each ship had been hit by hundreds of shells, but their main armour belts were unpenetrated. Zhenyuan was damaged on 7 November after hitting an unmarked reef, which took her out of active service until the following January.

Both ships were caught in the harbour during the Battle of Weihaiwei in early 1895, with Zhenyuan only partially seaworthy. They were unable to prevent the capture of the port's fortifications by the Japanese, and underwent nightly attacks by torpedo boats. Dingyuan was hit by a torpedo and began to sink. She was quickly beached, where she settled into the mud, and continued to be used as a defensive fort. Admiral Ruchang's flag was subsequently moved across to Zhenyuan. Following Ruchang's suicide, the surrender of the port and the fleet was arranged. Dingyuan was blown up at that time, but the exact nature of the explosion is unclear.

Zhenyuan was subsequently recommissioned in the Imperial Japanese Navy as Chin Yen, becoming the first true battleship in the fleet. She was added to the Navy list on 16 March, and subsequently rearmed. As other Japanese battleships joined the fleet, she was re-rated as a second-class battleship on 21 March 1898, then a first-class coastal defence ship on 11 December 1905. During her time under the Japanese flag, she served in the Russo-Japanese War as a convoy escort. She was stricken from the list on 1 April 1911, and used as a target for the Japanese battlecruiser . She was then sold for scrap on 6 April 1912, while her anchor has been preserved near to the city of Kobe.

The Chinese government built a replica of Dingyuan at Weihai, which is open as a museum ship. The wreck of the actual vessel was located in September 2019 and some 150 artifacts have been recovered.

See also 
 List of ironclads

Notes

References

 
 
 
 
 

Ships built in Stettin
 
Battleships of the Imperial Japanese Navy
Russo-Japanese War battleships of Japan